The Bristol Pirates were a Minor League Baseball team in Bristol, Virginia, United States. They were a Rookie-level team in the Appalachian League.

The team played home games at DeVault Memorial Stadium. Opened in 1969, Devault Memorial Stadium held 2,000 fans. The team was previously affiliated with the Detroit Tigers, and a previous manager was retired Tigers manager Jim Leyland. They were a farm team of the Chicago White Sox from 1995 to 2013 as the Bristol White Sox.

The team was operated by a non-profit organization, Bristol Baseball, Incorporated (BBI).  BBI had no full-time paid staff, instead relying on a volunteer board and general manager to keep and promote professional baseball in Bristol.

The start of the 2020 season was postponed due to the COVID-19 pandemic before ultimately being cancelled on June 30. In conjunction with a contraction of Minor League Baseball beginning with the 2021 season, the Appalachian League was reorganized as a collegiate summer baseball league, and the Pirates were replaced by a new franchise, the Bristol State Liners, in the revamped league designed for rising college freshmen and sophomores.

Season-by-season records

Playoffs
2019: Lost to Johnson City 2–1 in semifinals.
2002: Defeated Bluefield 2–1 to win championship.
1998: Defeated Princeton 2–0 to win championship.

Notable alumni

 Chris Carter (2005)
 Frank Catalanotto (1992-1993)
 Tony Clark (1990) MLB All-Star
 Juan Encarnacion (1994)
 Mark Fidrych (1974) 2 x MLB All-Star; 1976 AL ERA Leader; 1976 AL Rookie of the Year
 Travis Fryman (1987) 5 x MLB All-Star
 Freddy Garcia (2009) 2 x MLB All-Star; 2001 AL ERA Leader
 Gio Gonzalez (2004) 2 x MLB All-Star
 Jerry Hairston Sr. (2004, MGR)
 Chris Hoiles (1986)
 Carlos Lee (1995)
 Jose Lima (1990) MLB All-Star
 Jerry Manual (1972)
 Lance Parrish (1974) 8 x MLB All-Star
 Jon Rauch (1999)
 Vern Ruhle (1972)
 Bobby Thigpen (2007-2008, MGR) MLB All-Star
 Justin Thompson (1991) MLB All-Star
 Alan Trammell (1976) 6 x MLB All-Star; 1984 World Series Most Valuable Player; 2018 Member of the Baseball Hall of Fame
 Tom Veryzer (1971)
 Lou Whitaker (1975) 5 x MLB All-Star; 1978 AL Rookie of the Year

References

External links
 
 Statistics from Baseball-Reference

Baseball teams established in 1969
Baseball teams disestablished in 2020
Defunct Appalachian League teams
Bristol, Virginia
Professional baseball teams in Virginia
Pittsburgh Pirates minor league affiliates
1969 establishments in Virginia
2020 disestablishments in Virginia